California's 32nd State Senate district is one of 40 California State Senate districts. It is currently represented by Democrat Bob Archuleta of Pico Rivera.

District profile 
The district encompasses much of the Gateway Cities region in southeastern Los Angeles County. The district consists of several inner Los Angeles suburbs and is heavily Latino.

Los Angeles County – 8.9%
 Artesia
 Bellflower
 Cerritos
 Commerce
 Downey
 East La Mirada
 Hacienda Heights
 Hawaiian Gardens
 La Habra Heights
 La Mirada
 Lakewood – 63.7%
 Montebello
 Norwalk
 Pico Rivera
 Rose Hills/North Whittier
 Santa Fe Springs
 South Whittier
 West Whittier-Los Nietos
 Whittier

Orange County – 2.1%
 Buena Park – 76.2%

Election results from statewide races

List of senators 
Due to redistricting, the 32nd district has been moved around different parts of the state. The current iteration resulted from the 2011 redistricting by the California Citizens Redistricting Commission.

Election results 1994 - present

2018

2018 (special)

2014

2013 special

2010

2006

2002

1998

1994

See also 
 California State Senate
 California State Senate districts
 Districts in California

References

External links 
 District map from the California Citizens Redistricting Commission

32
Government of Los Angeles County, California
Government in Orange County, California
Artesia, California
Bell, California
Bellflower, California
Buena Park, California
Cerritos, California
Commerce, California
Downey, California
Hacienda Heights, California
La Mirada, California
Lakewood, California
Montebello, California
Norwalk, California
Pico Rivera, California
Santa Fe Springs, California
Whittier, California